Salinimicrobium flavum is a Gram-negative, facultatively anaerobic and rod-shaped bacterium from the genus of Salinimicrobium which has been isolated from marine sediments from the coast of Weihai.

References

Flavobacteria
Bacteria described in 2017